This is the list of cathedrals in Ecuador.

Roman Catholic
Cathedrals of the Roman Catholic Church in Ecuador:
 Cathedral Basilica of Our Lady of the Elevation, Ambato

 Our Lady of Mercy Cathedral, Babahoyo
 Metropolitan Cathedral of the Immaculate Conception in Cuenca
 Cathedral of Christ the King in Esmeraldas
 Cathedral of the Immaculate Conception on Galápagos
 Cathedral of St Peter in Guaranda
 Cathedral of St Peter in Guayaquil
 Our Lady of Mercy Cathedral, Machala
 Catedral Purísima de Macas in Méndez
 Cathedral of St Joseph in Napo
 Cathedral of Jesus the Good Shepherd in Portoviejo
 Cathedral of Our Lady of the Rosary in Puyo
 St. Peter Cathedral, Riobamba
 Primatial Cathedral of the Assumption of Our Lady to Heaven in Quito
 Cathedral-Basilica of St. Hyacinth in Yaguachi
 Cathedral of the Ascension in Santo Domingo de los Colorados

See also
List of cathedrals

References

 
Ecuador
Cathedrals
Cathedrals